Saint-Sulpice-de-Favières is a commune in the Essonne department in Île-de-France in northern France, located in the metropolitan area of Paris.

Inhabitants of Saint-Sulpice-de-Favières are known as Saint-Sulpiciens.

Geography
Saint-Sulpice-de-Favières is located in the Renarde valley,  South of Paris.

History
The previous name of the village is Favières from the Old French faveriis which itself is derived from the Latin fava (broad bean) meaning broad bean field.

Monuments

Saint-Sulpice church
The church was built during the 13th century and 14th century and is dedicated to Sulpice the Pious (ca 576-647), bishop of Bourges.

Segrez manor-house
The manor-house was built during the 18th century and hosted in 1884 one of the biggest arboretums of its time, the Arboretum de Segrez, with more than 6500 species of tree.

See also
Communes of the Essonne department

References

External links

Official website 
 Website of the Domaine de Segrez

Mayors of Essonne Association 

Communes of Essonne